David Cyrus (born 8 March 1989) is a Grenadian international footballer who plays as a defender for Inglewood United in the NPL Western Australia.

Career
Cyrus has played club football in England for Bradford Park Avenue, Ossett Town and most notably Frickley Athletic.

Whilst playing for Frickley Athletic Cyrus famously rejected a call up to the Grenada national team to play for Frickley in the F.A. Cup.

In 2013 Cyrus moved to Western Australia and initially played for Balcatta. He switched to Perth SC early in 2015 and has joined Inglewood United for the 2016 season.

Cyrus made his international debut for Grenada on 26 November 2010.

References

1989 births
Living people
Grenadian footballers
Association football defenders
Bradford (Park Avenue) A.F.C. players
Ossett Town F.C. players
Frickley Athletic F.C. players
Perth SC players
Inglewood United FC players
National Premier Leagues players
Grenada international footballers
2011 CONCACAF Gold Cup players
Grenadian expatriate footballers
Grenadian expatriate sportspeople in England
Grenadian expatriate sportspeople in Australia
Expatriate footballers in England
Expatriate soccer players in Australia